Blue dolphin or Blue Dolphin may refer to:

 Blue Dolphin, a yacht and research vessel designed in 1926 by William Roue
 Blue Dolphin Energy Company, an American oil and natural gas company
 Blue Dolphin Enterprises, parent company of Pacific Comics, a former American comic book publisher
 Blue dolphin cichlid (Cyrtocara moorii), a fish endemic to Lake Malawi in east Africa
 Blue Dolphin and Blue Dolphin 2, ships operated by Tsugaru Kaikyō Ferry in Japan

See also
 Island of the Blue Dolphins, a children's novel by Scott O'Dell which won the 1960 Newbery Medal